The Dukes were an Australian rock band active from 1991 to 1994. Initially called Sean Kelly and the Iron Dukes, they were formed by Sean Kelly (ex-Models, Absent Friends) on vocals and keyboards; and Geoffrey Stapleton (GANGgajang, Absent Friends) on keyboards and guitar. They were soon joined by Michael Armiger (Paul Kelly and the Coloured Girls, The Go-Betweens) on bass guitar; Michael King (Absent Friends) on guitar and backing vocals; and John Mackay (Absent Friends) on drums and percussion.

Biography
The band were originally called Sean Kelly and The Iron Dukes, but were renamed shortly after to The Dukes. The band was formed by Sean Kelly (Models) and Geoffrey Stapleton (GANGgajang) following their return to Sydney in 1991 after the completion of a European tour, supporting INXS, with their previous band Absent Friends. The original members of the Iron Dukes were Kelly, Stapleton, Michael Armiger (Paul Kelly and the Coloured Girls, The Go-Betweens), Michael King (Absent Friends) and John Mackay (Absent Friends). Other band members were bass player Peter Willersdorf, drummer Tony Georgeson, Mark Dennison (DD Smash) on saxophone and occasional keyboard and Kevin Dubber (DD Smash) on trumpet. In 1992 they signed with Sony Music.

In 1992, they released a number of singles, with "Gonna Get High" and "Faith" reaching No. 60 and No. 29 respectively on the Australian singles charts. In December 1992 the band released its debut and only album, Harbour City, it was co-written and co-produced by Kelly and Stapleton. Stapleton providing paintings for each song for the album booklet and the art work for all of the single and album covers. Harbour City was nominated for an ARIA Award in 1993 for the category 'Best Breakthrough Artist – Album'.

In 1993 they released the EP, I Fought The Law, three tracks from which also appeared on the 1993 soundtrack for the Yahoo Serious movie Reckless Kelly.

On 23 September 1993 The Dukes performed "Faith" to 250,000 people at Circular Quay, minutes before Sydney was announced as the host city for the 2000 Summer Olympics. The band disbanded in early 1994.

Members
 Mark Dennison – saxophone (1991–1993)
 Kevin Dubber – trumpet (1991–1993)
 Tony Georgeson – drums, percussion (1991–1993)
 Sean Kelly – vocals, guitar (1991–1993)
 Geoff Stapleton – keyboard, guitar (1991–1993)
 Peter Willersdorf – bass (1991–1993)

Discography

Studio albums

Extended plays

Singles

Awards

ARIA Music Awards
The ARIA Music Awards is an annual awards ceremony that recognises excellence, innovation, and achievement across all genres of Australian music. 

|-
| 1993
| Harbour City
| ARIA Award for Breakthrough Artist – Album
|

References

Musical groups from Sydney
Musical groups established in 1991
Musical groups disestablished in 1994
Australian rock music groups